O'Neill Family Hall is one of the 32 residence halls on the campus of the University of Notre Dame and one of the 16 male dorms. Built in 1996, the dormitory was funded by the O'Neill family from Midland, Texas.

History

Established in 1996, O'Neill became both the first residence hall built on West Quad and the first residence hall constructed for men since Flanner and Grace Halls were built in 1969. The construction of halls on West Quad served to relocate students from Flanner and Grace. These two dorms, which each contained more than 500 students and spanned 11 floors, were converted into faculty, administration, and office space. The majority of Grace residents went to either O'Neill or Keough. The four new dorms (O'Neill, Keough, Welsh Family, and McGlinn) built on West Quad were all of similar plan and build, each consisting mostly of double with some single and triple rooms, and hosting between 262 and 282 students.

The move from Grace Hall is represented in the O'Neill mascot, the Angry Mob. Some students, angry about the relocation, held a series of bonfires in protest. When the time came to choose a mascot for O'Neill, residents decided to carry on the memory of their former dorm by naming themselves the Angry Mob. Once established and filled with students, O'Neill quickly became known for its signature event, Mardi Gras which was later terminated by the University.

Description 

O'Neill Hall features 7 residential sections (two for each floor with exception to one section on the first floor). O'Neill has 24-hour social spaces, study areas, laundry facilities on the first floor, and TV lounges on each floor. It also has an exercise room, a chapel dedicated to Saint Joseph the Worker, air conditioning, and modular furniture. A student-run pizzeria operates some nights of the week. The floor plan is identical to that of Welsh Family Hall.

Coat of arms
The O'Neill coat of arms presents the name of the hall, and the year of its founding, along with two Latin quotes. On the lower left, the words “Mobilium turba Quiritium” come from Horace (65BC – 8BC), the leading Roman poet of his time, and are literally translated as “a crowd of inconsistent citizens,” but are thought to be the origin of the word “mob.” O’Neill Hall's nickname on campus is “The Mob.” On the lower right side are the words “Fratres in Unum,” which translates from Latin as “Brothers as One.” The name “O’Neill” literally means “champion,” and the red hand on the upper left side of the shield is a symbol of the O’Neill family motto, “the red hand of Ireland in defiance,” sometimes given as “the red hand of Ireland forever.” The Coat of Arms contains the Red hand of Ulster, part of the coat of arms of the O'Neill family, who donated the dorm, since the 14th century.

Notable events/activities 
 Hanging of Christmas wreath "O".
 Mardi Gras: Terminated by the University, this event was a dorm-wide event celebrated the weekend before the beginning of Lent. The event was later cancelled due to pressure from the University and as noted by then rector, Ed Mack, "It got out of hand."
In October, the dorm hosts “Without a Home,” an all-night vigil to raise awareness and funds to aid the South Bend Center for the Homeless. Sunday Mass collections are donated to the Center as well.
O'Neill's signature event is the Miss ND Pageant, in which contestants from each female dorm compete for the title of "Miss ND." Proceeds from the event benefit the South Bend Center for the Homeless.
At the end of the annual section football season, as the best section football teams from O'Neill and Keough play each other for the right to hold the Grace Cup. This is in remembrance of the fact that students from O'Neill and Keough relocated from the defunct Grace Hall.

Notable former residents
 Kyle McAlarney, former Notre Dame basketball player
 Kyle Rudolph, starting Tight End on Minnesota Vikings
 Justin Tuck, former NFL Defensive Lineman and Super Bowl Champion with the New York Giants
Darius Walker
David Givens
Geoff Price
Maurice Stovall
Austin Swift
Jason Zimbler
Hunter Smith

Other sources
 Notre Dame Office of Housing Profile for O'Neill Hall
 ND Magazine

References

External links
 O'Neill Hall Website
 University of Notre Dame Website

University of Notre Dame buildings and structures
University of Notre Dame residence halls